Tāq Kasrā, also transcribed as Taq-i Kisra or Taq-e Kesra (romanized: tâğe kasrâ) or Ayvān-e Kesrā (meaning Iwan of Chosroes) are the remains of a Sasanian-era Persian monument, dated to c. the 3rd to 6th-century, which is sometimes called the Arch of Ctesiphon. It is located near the modern town of Salman Pak, Iraq. It was the facade of the main palace in Ctesiphon, and is the only visible remaining structure of the ancient capital city. The archway is considered a landmark in the history of architecture, and is the second largest single-span vault of unreinforced brickwork in the world after Gavmishan Bridge.

History 
The exact time of construction is not known with certainty. Some historians believe the founder is Shapur I who ruled Iran from 242 to 272 AD and some other believe that construction possibly began during the reign of Anushiruwan the Just (Khosrow I) after a campaign against the Byzantines in 540 AD. The arched iwan hall, open on the facade side, was about 37 meters high 26 meters across and 50 meters long, the largest man-made, free standing vault constructed until modern times.

The arch was part of the imperial palace complex. The throne room—presumably under or behind the arch—was more than 30 m (110 ft) high and covered an area 24 m (80 ft) wide by 48 m (160 ft) long. The top of the arch is about 1 meter thick while the walls at the base are up to 7 meters thick. The catenary arch was built without centring. In order to make this possible a number of techniques were used. The bricks were laid about 18 degrees from the vertical which allowed them to be partially supported by the rear wall during construction. The quick drying cement used as mortar allowed the fresh bricks to be quickly supported by those that were previously laid.

The Taq Kasra is now all that remains above ground of a city that was, for nine centuries—from the 2nd century BC to the 7th century AD—the main capital of the successor dynasties of the Persian empire: Parthians and Sassanids. The structure left today was the main portico of the audience hall of the Sassanids who maintained the same site chosen by the Parthians and for the same reason, namely proximity to the Roman Empire, whose expansionist aims could be better contained at the point of contact.

The structure was captured by the Arabs during the conquest of Persia in AD 637. They then used it as a mosque for a while until the area was gradually abandoned. In the early 10th century, the Abbasid caliph al-Muktafi dug up the ruins of the palace to reuse its bricks in the construction of the Taj Palace in Baghdad.

The monument is also the subject of a poem by Khaqani, who visited the ruins in the 12th century.

Modern era
In 1851, French artist Eugène Flandin visited and studied the structure with Pascal Coste who remarked "the Romans had nothing similar or of the type".

In 1888, a serious flood demolished the greater part of the edifice.

In 1940, Roald Dahl, then undergoing pilot training at RAF Habbaniya near Baghdad took an award-winning photograph using a Zeiss camera of the Arch of Ctesiphon in Iraq which was subsequently auctioned by the Dahl family to raise funds for the Roald Dahl Museum and Story Centre. The photo made £6,000. In his autobiography Boy he writes:

 You may not believe it, but when I was eighteen I used to win prizes and medals from the Royal Photographic Society in London, and from other places like the Photographic Society of Holland. I even got a lovely big bronze medal from the Egyptian Photographic Society in Cairo, and I still have the photograph that won it. It is a picture of one of the so-called Seven Wonders of the World, the Arch of Ctesiphon in Iraq. This is the largest unsupported arch on earth and I took the photograph while I was training out there for the RAF in 1940. I was flying over the desert solo in an old Hawker Hart biplane and I had my camera round my neck. When I spotted the huge arch standing alone in a sea of sand, I dropped one wing and hung in my straps and let go of the stick while I took aim and clicked the shutter. It came out fine.

The monument was in the process of being rebuilt by Saddam Hussein's government in the course of the 1980s, when the fallen northern wing was partially rebuilt. All works, however, stopped after the 1991 Persian Gulf War. From 2004 to 2008 the Iraqi government cooperated with the University of Chicago's Diyala Project to restore the site at a cost of $100,000. The Ministry of Culture also invited a Czech company, Avers, to restore the site. This restoration was completed in 2017.

On March 7, 2019, a partial collapse further damaged the Taq Kasra, just two years after its latest restoration was completed.

In January 2021, Iranian Minister of Cultural Heritage Ali Asghar Mounesan mentioned that a credit of about $600,000 would be required for the restoration of Taq Kasra.

Documentary film
In 2017, Pejman Akbarzadeh, based in the Netherlands, made the first full-length documentary film about Taq Kasra: Taq Kasra: Wonder of Architecture. The monument had been in danger of ISIS attacks in 2015-2016; Akbarzadeh feared that it might be destroyed soon, and therefore felt urgency to film his documentary. The film explores the history and architecture of Taq Kasra with prolific scholars and archaeologists in various countries.

Gallery

See also
 Persian Empire
 Sasanians
 Al-Ukhaidir Fortress
 Hatra
 Persian architecture

References

External links 

 Taq Kasra Online Information Center
 Archent: Taq-i Kisra
 Global Heritage Fund page on Ctesiphon
 Swiss journalist's photos of Taq-e Kasra in 1970s: "Taq-e Kasra; a Persian archaeological sight outside Persia (Photo)

Archaeological sites in Iraq
Sasanian architecture
Ctesiphon
Khosrow I
Buildings and structures completed in the 6th century
Sasanian palaces
Palaces in Iraq